Tetrapedia is a genus of green algae in the family Hydrodictyaceae.

References

Sphaeropleales genera
Sphaeropleales